Diplephippium is a genus of flies in the family Stratiomyidae.

Species
Diplephippium amphicentrium Speiser, 1908
Diplephippium snyderi James, 1949		
Diplephippium tessmanni Grünberg, 1915

References

Stratiomyidae
Brachycera genera
Taxa named by Paul Gustav Eduard Speiser
Diptera of Africa